The rivière aux Orignaux (in English: Moose River) is a tributary of the south shore of the St. Lawrence River. This river flows in the municipality of Sainte-Sophie-de-Lévrard, Saint-Pierre-les-Becquets and in the area of Gentilly of the town of Bécancour and in the Bécancour Regional County Municipality, in the administrative region of Centre-du-Québec, in Quebec, in Canada.

Toponymy 
The name of the river appears on an 1858 map. It underlines the ancient presence of the original in Centre-du-Québec. It was also known under the name of Chaud brook.

Geography 
The main neighboring watersheds of the Orignaux River are:
 North side: La Plaine stream, St. Lawrence River, Petite rivière du Chêne;
 East side: Sources stream, Petite rivière du Chêne;
 South side: Ours stream, rivière aux Glaises, Bras Chaud creek, Beaudet River, Gentilly River;
 West side: St. Lawrence River, rivière du Moulin.

The Rivière des Orignaux takes its source in an agricultural zone to the south of the village of Sainte-Sophie-de-Lévrard, at the confluence of the Bras Chaud stream (having its source in Sainte-Marie-de-Blandford) and Bras de Cretons (taking its source in Lemieux).

Upper course of the river (segment of )

  north-east to a country road;
  north-east, winding up to Chemin Saint-Agathe;
  north, winding and curving west, returning to Chemin Saint-Agathe;
  north, passing east of the village of Sainte-Sophie-de-Lévrard and winding up to route 226 where it collects the waters of the Bass Ruisseau du Sixième Rang;
  north-west, winding up to the road to Rang Saint-Ovide;

Lower course of the river (segment of )

From the route du rang Saint-François-Xavier (east of the village of Sainte-Cécile-de-Lévrard, the river flows over:
  westward, up to its confluence.

Rivière aux Orignaux empties at the tip of Rivière aux Orignaux, on the south shore of the Estuary of Saint Lawrence, at the extreme east of the territory of the town of Bécancour (Gentilly sector).

See also 

 List of rivers of Quebec

References 

Rivers of Centre-du-Québec